The 2014–15 season was Middlesbrough's 6th consecutive season in the Championship. They also competed in the League Cup and in the FA Cup.

Statistics

Appearances and goals
Last updated 2 May 2015
"+" constitutes substitute appearances

|-
|colspan="14"|Players away from the club on loan:

|-
|colspan="14"|Players who appeared for Middlesbrough but left during the season:

|}

Top scorers
Last updated 17 April 2015

Disciplinary record

Competitions

Pre-season and friendlies

Championship

League table

League results summary

Matches

The fixtures for the 2014–15 season were announced on 18 June 2014 at 9am.

FA Cup

League Cup

The draw for the first round was made on 17 June 2014 at 10am. Middlesbrough were drawn away to Oldham Athletic.

Transfers

In

Out

Loans in

Loans out

References

Middlesbrough F.C. seasons
Middlesbrough